Korean Air Flight 801 (KE801, KAL801) was a scheduled international passenger flight operated by Korean Air. The flight crashed on August 6, 1997, on approach to Antonio B. Won Pat International Airport, in the United States territory of Guam, killing 229 of the 254 people aboard. The aircraft crashed on Bijia Peak, south of Nimitz Hill, in Asan-Maina, Guam, while on approach to the airport. The National Transportation Safety Board cites poor communication between the flight crew as probable cause for the air crash, along with the captain's poor decision-making on the non-precision approach. It remains the deadliest aviation disaster in the United States and its territories to have survivors.

Aircraft and crew

Aircraft 

Flight 801 was normally flown by an Airbus A300, but since Korean Air had scheduled the August 5–6 flight to transport Chamorro athletes to the South Pacific Mini Games in American Samoa, the airline designated HL7468, a 12-year-old Boeing 747-300 delivered to Korean Air on December 12, 1984, to fly the route that night.

Crew 
The flight was under the command of 42-year-old Captain Park Yong-chul (Korean: 박용철, Hanja: 朴鏞喆, RR: Bak Yong-cheol. M-R: Pak Yongch'ŏl) The captain had close to 9,000 hours of flight time, including 3,192 on the Boeing 747, and had recently received a Flight Safety Award for negotiating a 747 engine failure at low altitude. Park was originally scheduled to fly to Dubai, United Arab Emirates; but since he had not had enough rest for the Dubai trip, he was reassigned to Flight 801.  The first officer was 40-year-old Song Kyung-ho (Korean: 송경호, Hanja: 宋慶昊, RR: Song Gyeong-ho, M-R: Song Kyŏngho), who had more than 4,000 hours' flying experience, including 1,560 hours on the Boeing 747, and the flight engineer was 57-year-old Nam Suk-hoon (Korean: 남석훈, Hanja: 南錫薰, RR: Nam Seok-hun, M-R: Nam Sŏkhun), a veteran pilot with more than 13,000 flight hours, including 1,573 hours on the Boeing 747.

Accident

 

Flight 801 departed from Seoul-Kimpo International Airport (now Gimpo International Airport) at 8:53 p.m. (9:53 p.m. Guam time) on August 5 on its way to Guam. It carried three flight crew members (the two pilots and the flight engineer), 14 flight attendants, and 237 passengers from 4 countries, a total of 254 people. Of the passengers, three were children between the ages of 2 and 12 and three were 24 months old or younger. Six of the passengers were Korean Air flight attendants, who were deadheading.

The flight experienced some turbulence, but was uneventful until shortly after 1:00 a.m. on August 6, as the jet was preparing to land. There was heavy rain on Guam so visibility was considerably reduced and the crew attempted an instrument landing. The glideslope Instrument Landing System (ILS) for runway 6L was out of service. However, Captain Park believed it was in service,  and at 1:35 am managed to pick up a signal that was later identified to be from an irrelevant electronic device on the ground. The crew noticed that the aircraft was descending very steeply, and noted several times that the airport "is not in sight." Despite its name, the NIMITZ VOR is separated from Nimitz Hill by the Fonte River valley, though Nimitz Hill Annex was the closest inhabited place. 

Of the 254 people on board, 229 died as a result of the crash. One survivor, 36-year-old Hyun Seong Hong (홍현성, also spelled Hong Hyun Sung) of the United States, occupied Seat 3B in first class, and said that the crash occurred so quickly that the passengers "had no time to scream" and likened the crash to "a scene from a film."

Rescue 

The rescue effort was hampered by the weather, terrain, and other problems. Emergency vehicles could not approach due to a fuel pipeline, destroyed by the crash, blocking the narrow road. United States Navy Seabees of NMCB-133 were some of the first on the scene as they utilized their earth-moving equipment to clear roadways and timber from the crash site approach. The Seabees used backhoes to crack open the still-burning plane to rescue survivors and erected mortuary tents for first responders. There was confusion over the administration of the effort; the crash occurred on land owned by the United States Navy but civil authorities initially claimed authority. The hull had disintegrated, and jet fuel in the wing tanks had sparked a fire that was still burning eight hours after impact.

Rika Matsuda

Governor Carl Gutierrez found 11-year-old Rika Matsuda, from Japan, who boarded the flight with her mother, 44-year-old Shigeko. They were heading to Guam on vacation. Rika Matsuda described what happened to her and her mother to interpreters. Shigeko could not free herself from the aircraft and told Rika to run away. Luggage piled on the girl and her mother as the crash occurred; Rika Matsuda said her mother, unable to free herself, asked her to leave. Shigeko died in the fire. After escaping from the aircraft, Rika discovered a surviving flight attendant, Lee Yong Ho (이용호). They stayed together until Gutierrez discovered them. Rika Matsuda, treated at Guam Memorial Hospital in Tamuning, was released on August 7, 1997, and was reunited with her father, Tatsuo Matsuda. The two were then escorted to the Governor House where they were the guests of Gutierrez and the First Lady of Guam, Geri Gutierrez, for several days; afterward Rika and Tatsuo Matsuda flew to Japan.

Investigation and probable cause

The U.S. National Transportation Safety Board (NTSB) investigated the accident.

A special weather observation made at 01:32, ten minutes before the impact, reported:

Wind 090° at 6 knots; visibility—7 miles; present weather—shower vicinity; sky condition—scattered 1,600 feet, broken 2,500 feet, overcast 5,000 feet [above ground level]; temperature—27° C; dew point—25° C; altimeter setting 29.85 inches Hg; remarks—showers vicinity northwest-northeast. 

Another special weather observation made at 01:47, five minutes after the impact, reported:

Wind variable at 4 knots; visibility—5 miles; present weather—light rain shower; sky condition—few 1,500 feet, scattered 2,500 feet, overcast 4,000 feet; temperature—26° C; dew point—24° C; altimeter 29.85 inches Hg. 

The report also identified that the captain may have mistakenly believed that the airplane was closer to the airport
than it was and that there may have been confusion about the location of the Distance Measuring Equipment (DME) in relation to the airport, with the crew anticipating the VOR/DME to be located at the airport. Nevertheless, the correct DME distances were shown on the approach chart.

The NTSB was critical of the flight crew's monitoring of the approach, and even more critical of why the first officer and flight engineer did not challenge the captain for his errors. Even before the accident, Korean Air's crew resource management program was already attempting to promote a free atmosphere between the flight crew, requiring the first officer and flight engineer to challenge the captain if they felt concerned. However, the flight crew only began to challenge the captain six seconds before impact, when the first officer urged the captain to make a missed approach. According to the cockpit voice recorder (CVR), the flight crew had suggested to the captain that he made a mistake, but did not explicitly warn him. The flight crew had the opportunity to be more aggressive in his challenge and the first officer even had the opportunity to take over control of the aircraft and execute a missed approach himself, which would have prevented the accident, but he did not do this. Despite examining Korean Air's safety culture and previous incidents, the NTSB was unable to determine the exact reasons why the flight crew failed to challenge the captain, but at the same time noted that "problems associated with subordinate officers challenging a captain are well known."

Air Traffic Control also played a role in the accident. The center/approach controller, 39-year-old Kurt James Mayo, did not adhere to standard ATC procedures and failed to monitor the aircraft during its descent. Specifically, he did not monitor the flight after they switched to the tower frequency as required, did not give a position advisory to the flight crew when clearing them for the approach (which would have advised them to cross-check their position on the radar with that of other flight instruments), and did not monitor the flight on the terminal radar display which showed the terrain in the area because radar service had been terminated at the time. The NTSB said that had Mayo followed the procedures, the accident could have been prevented or at least reduce its severity. The tower controller, Marty Irvin Theobald (also 39), was also criticized for not alerting the crew, as Mayo had been unaware of the aircraft's low altitude, and did not provide an alert to him.

The NTSB also criticized the emergency responders for their delayed rescue operation, citing that most of the factors that delayed the response were preventable. These factors included ATC's initial unawareness of the accident, a brake failure on a firetruck, and, a delayed notification of the fire department. The NTSB also concluded that at least one person who survived the initial crash could have recovered had the response not been delayed.

The NTSB presented its findings on March 24, 25 and 26, 1998, at the Hawaii Convention Center in Honolulu.

The section of the report entitled "Probable Cause" concluded:

The National Transportation Safety Board determines that the probable cause of this accident was the captain's failure to adequately brief and execute the non-precision approach and the first officer's and flight engineer's failure to effectively monitor and cross-check the captain's execution of the approach.  Contributing to these failures were the captain's fatigue and Korean Air's inadequate flight crew training.

Contributing to the accident was the Federal Aviation Administration's intentional inhibition of the minimum safe altitude warning system at Guam and the agency's failure to adequately manage the system.The investigation report stated that a contributing factor was that the ATC Minimum Safe Altitude Warning (MSAW) system at Antonio B. Won Pat International Airport had been deliberately modified so as to limit spurious alarms and could not detect an approaching aircraft that was below minimum safe altitude. The probable cause of the accident was the captain's poor execution of the non-precision approach, the captain's fatigue, poor communication between the flight crew, and Korean Air's lack of flight crew training.

Passengers

Deaths and injuries
Of the 254 people on board, 223 people – 209 passengers and 14 crew members (all three flight crew and 11 cabin crew) – were killed at the crash site.

Of the 31 occupants found alive by rescue crews, two died en route to the hospital and a further three in hospital. Among the survivors, 16 received burn injuries. The 26 survivors were initially treated at Guam Memorial Hospital (GMH) in Tamuning or at Naval Hospital Guam in Agana Heights. Four were subsequently transferred to the U.S. Army Burn Center in San Antonio, Texas. and eight to University Hospital in Seoul. On October 10 of that year, one passenger died of their injuries, bringing the number of fatalities to 229 and the number of survivors to 25.

There were 22 passengers and three flight attendants who survived the crash with serious injuries.

Notable passengers
Shin Ki-ha, a four-term South Korean parliamentarian and former leader of the National Congress for New Politics, traveled with his wife and around 20 party members. Shin and his wife were both killed.

Identification and repatriation of bodies

On August 13, 1997, twelve sets of remains were brought to Guam's airport to be readied to be flown back to Seoul. Clifford Guzman, a governor's aide, said that two of the 12 were taken back to the morgue. Of the 10, one was misidentified and had to be switched before takeoff. The 10 bodies transported to Seoul were those of seven passengers and three female flight attendants. On the same date, an NTSB family affairs official named Matthew Furman said that in total, by that date, 46 bodies had been identified.

After the crash

After the crash occurred, the airline provided several flights for around 300 relatives so that they could go to the crash site.

On August 13, 1997, fifty protesters staged a sit-in at Guam Airport, saying that the recovery of the dead was taking too long; they sat on blankets and sheets of paper at the Korean Air counter.

Legacy
On August 5, 1998, the first anniversary of the crash, a black marble obelisk was unveiled on the crash site as a memorial to the victims.

After the accident, Korean Air services to Guam were suspended for more than four years, leading to reduced tourist spending in Guam and reduced revenues for Korean Air. When Seoul-Guam services resumed in December 2001, the flight number was changed to 805. The flight number for its Seoul-Guam route is now 111 and operates out of Incheon instead of Gimpo, using a Boeing 777-300ER or an Airbus A330.

In 2000, a lawsuit was settled in the amount of US$70 million on behalf of 54 families against the airline.

New Zealander Barry Small, a helicopter pilot and a survivor of the accident, lobbied for safer storage of duty-free alcohol and redesigns of crossbars on airline seats; he said that the storage of duty-free alcohol on Flight 801 contributed to the spreading of the fire and the crossbars injured passengers to the point where they could not escape from the aircraft (Small himself was injured when he broke his leg on one of the crossbars during the crash, but was still able to escape the aircraft).

The Government of Guam moved its website about the Korean Air crash after the Spamcop program alerted the government that advance fee fraud spam from Nigeria used the website link as a part of the scam. Scam e-mails used names of passengers, such as Sean Burke, as part of the fraud.

Following the Korean Air 801 crash, it was brought to the NTSB's attention that foreign carriers flying in and out of the US were not covered by the Aviation Disaster Family Assistance Act of 1996 and Korean Air did not have a plan to deal with the situation they encountered. As a result, US Congress passed the Foreign Air Carrier Family Support Act of 1997 to require those carriers to file family assistance plans and fulfill the same family support requirements as domestic airlines. Not only does the Act ensure that all victims and family members will be treated equitably, regardless of the carrier they use; but it also impels many carriers that may not have thought about family assistance issues to give them due consideration in their emergency response plans.

In popular culture
Malcolm Gladwell discusses the crash in the context of cultural effects on power structures in his book Outliers.
The Discovery Channel Canada / National Geographic TV series Mayday (also called Air Crash Investigation or Air Emergency) dramatized the accident in a 2007 episode titled "Final Approach," although it was also titled "Missed Approach" for the episode on Air Disasters, and "Blind Landing" for the UK.
It is featured in season 2, episode 1, of the TV show Why Planes Crash, in an episode called "Crisis in the Sky".

See also
 List of aviation accidents and incidents involving CFIT
 Impact of culture on aviation safety

Notes

References

Additional sources 
National Transportation Safety Board 
Korean Air Flight 801 Final Accident Report
Government of Guam: Guam Crash Site Center – Korean Air Flight 801, photographs, passenger manifest, scanned news articles, and related links
 PBS Newshour with Jim Lehrer: "Tragedy on Guam," August 6, 1997
 "List of passengers aboard Korean Air Flight 801" (also lists crew members)  CNN
 Airline's List Of Survivors," The New York Times. August 7, 1997.
 Pollack, Andrew. "Pilot Error Is Suspected in Crash on Guam," The New York Times. August 8, 1997.
Guam rescuers: 27 survivors, no more expected, CNN (Archive)
 Pilot error focus in Guam crash, CNN
Photos used to identify Guam crash victims, CNN (Archive)
 29 Survive the Guam Crash, but Hope for Others Ends, The New York Times
Rescuers search smoldering jet debris in Guam, CNN (Archive)
 Tragedy on Guam, PBS

External links

"Korean Air Flight 801." (Alternate) (Archive) – National Transportation Safety Board
Cockpit Voice Recorder transcript and accident summary
 Hosenball, Mark and Watson, Russell. "Fly The Risky Skies." Newsweek. August 18, 1997.
 Wald, Matthew L. "Tape Shows Crew's Confusion in Guam Crash." The New York Times. March 25, 1998.
 "Safety Board Cites Crew, Carrier, Controller, and Regulatory Authorities' Lapses in Guam Crash." (Archive) Air Safety Week. November 8, 1999.
 "Families Try to Identify Bodies in Korean Crash." (Archive) The New York Times. August 10, 1997.

Airliner accidents and incidents involving controlled flight into terrain
Airliner accidents and incidents caused by weather
Airliner accidents and incidents caused by pilot error
Aviation accidents and incidents in 1997
Accidents and incidents involving the Boeing 747
Airliner accidents and incidents in Guam
801
South Korea–United States relations
1997 in Guam
1997 meteorology
Articles containing video clips
August 1997 events in Oceania
Aviation accidents and incidents caused by air traffic controller error